Australia puts on many group races all year. Here is a list of greyhound group racing in Australia.

Group 1,2 and 3 races 
Click on the sort symbol at the top of the columns to sort on a particular field.

References 

Greyhound racing in Australia